Brymbo Football Club are a football club based in Tanyfron, Wrexham. They play in the North East Wales Football League Premier Division, which is in the fourth tier of the Welsh football league system. The team, originally Brymbo Steelworks F.C., was formed as part of Brymbo Steelworks.

History
For a full history see; List of football seasons involving Brymbo teams

Brymbo Football Club was formed over 70 years ago as part of the Brymbo Steelworks Complex. During their history Brymbo F.C. have won the Welsh National League (Wrexham Area) on fourteen occasions and have numerous Cup successes, the major ones being the 1967 Welsh Amateur Cup win and the Welsh F.A. Brymbo F.C became winners of the Cymru Alliance League Cup at the first attempt under management of Gareth Powell who later went onto manage LEX X1. Gareth Powell had also managed Cefn Druids who helped the club steadily consolidated in the Cymru Alliance, helped by a renewed youth policy who strolled to the 1998–99 Cymru Alliance championship, scoring over 100 goals in the process.

Merger with New Broughton
In 1996, Brymbo merged with neighbouring village team New Broughton F.C. to create Brymbo Broughton.
At that time Brymbo played in the Cymru Alliance League while New Broughton were in the Welsh National League (Wrexham Area) Premier Division. New Broughton had a good, experienced Committee and were financially sound, but unfortunately their playing facilities (which were Council owned) did not reach the standards set for a higher level of football. Brymbo, however, had excellent facilities but were lacking experience and expertise in key off-field positions and were financially insecure.

Merger with Summerhill United
In 2005, Brymbo Broughton merged with Summerhill United to form Summerhill Brymbo. This lasted for one season before the name was reverted to Brymbo for the 2006–07 season.

In the 2018–19 season the club originally finished third in the league. After the end of the season were deducted the second highest points in Welsh league history, 63 points, and instead finished bottom of the league. The club avoided relegation from the division as FC Nomads of Connah’s Quay withdrew from the league and Hawarden Rangers accepted relegation.

Facilities
The club is based at The Brymbo Sports and Social Complex in Tanyfron.

The home colours are amber and black shirts with black shorts and socks

Honours
Brymbo and New Broughton Senior Teams

League
Brymbo
Cymru Alliance
Runners-up : 1995
Third : 1996
Welsh National League (Wrexham Area) Premier Division
Winners : 2007, 2008

Brymbo Steelworks
Welsh National League (Wrexham Area) Premier Division
Winners : 1958, 1966, 1967, 1969, 1970, 1971, 1974, 1977, 1978, 1979, 1982, 1983, 2007, 2008
Runners-up : 1946, 1955, 1956, 1972, 1976, 1978, 1984
Third : 1962, 1968, 1980, 1981, 1988

Brymbo Broughton
Welsh National League (Wrexham Area) Premier Division
Third : 2004

New Broughton
Welsh National League (Wrexham Area) Premier Division
Third : 1952
Welsh National League (Wrexham Area) Division 1
Winners : 1991, 1996
Runners-up : 1951
Welsh National League (Wrexham Area) Division 2
Winners : 1990
Welsh National League (Wrexham Area) Division 3
Winners : 1988
Welsh National League (Wrexham Area) Division 4
Winners : 1981

Cups
Brymbo
FAW Trophy
Winners : 2007

North East Wales FA Challenge Cup
Winners : 1996

Welsh National League (Wrexham Area) Premier Division League Cup
Winners : 2008, 2013

Presidents Cup
Winners : 1996

Brymbo Steelworks
FAW Trophy
Winners : 1967
Runners-up : 1980, 1983

North East Wales FA Challenge Cup
Winners : 1970, 1971, 1982, 1983, 1985

Welsh National League (Wrexham Area) Premier Division League Cup
Winners : 1948, 1969, 1970, 1981, 1982, 1983, 1984, 1986

New Broughton
Welsh National League (Wrexham Area) Premier Division League Cup
Winners : 1996

Welsh National League (Wrexham Area) Division One League Cup
Winners : 1991

References 

Football clubs in Wales
Football clubs in Wrexham
Welsh National League (Wrexham Area) Premier Division clubs
Sport in Wrexham County Borough
Association football clubs established in 1943
1943 establishments in Wales
Cymru Alliance clubs
Works association football teams in Wales
Ardal Leagues clubs